Kuhmalahti (also ) is a former municipality of Finland. It was consolidated with the municipality of Kangasala on January 1, 2011.

It was located in the Pirkanmaa region.

The municipality was unilingually Finnish.

People born in Kuhmalahti
Yrjö Leiwo (1884 – 1964)

References

External links

Municipality of Kuhmalahti – Official website 

Kangasala
Former municipalities of Finland
Populated places established in 1865
Populated places disestablished in 2011